is a passenger railway station located in the town of Sayō, Sayō District, Hyōgo Prefecture, Japan, operated by West Japan Railway Company (JR West).

Lines

Station layout
The station consists of two opposed side platforms connected to the station building by a footbridge. The station is unattended, but has a local products store and noodle shop.

Platforms

Adjacent stations

History
Kōzuki Station opened on April 8, 1938.  With the privatization of the Japan National Railways (JNR) on April 1, 1987, the station came under the aegis of the West Japan Railway Company.

Passenger statistics
In fiscal 2019, the station was used by an average of 37 passengers daily.

Surrounding area
 Sayō Town Hall Kōzuki Branch
 Sayō Municipal Kōzuki Junior High School
 Sayō Municipal Kōzuki Elementary School
 Kōzuki Castle Ruins

See also
List of railway stations in Japan

References

External links

 Station Official Site

Railway stations in Hyōgo Prefecture
Kishin Line
Railway stations in Japan opened in 1936
Sayō, Hyōgo